Hopla is a Belgian CGI-animated series for toddlers, created by Bert Smets in 2000, and produced by Bert Smets Productions. The cartoon features the rabbit Hopla and his friends – the pig Onki, the bear Nina, and the kitten Lola. Each episode is about five minutes. Similar to its spiritual predecessor Tik Tak, the show is aimed at children between 0–2 years old and has no dialogue (the only dialogue is the show's name). The show was animated with Strata 3D.

The show first aired on Ketnet, a Flemish television channel, in 2000, and became popular soon afterward. Hopla has been aired in 31 countries (including Belgium, Canada, Finland, France, Spain, Israel, Italy, Japan, Poland, Portugal, South Korea, Turkey and the United States). In Belgium, Hopla's home entertainment titles have sold over 300,000 copies and their book-related merchandise has garnered sales close to 700,000. In Portugal, the show aired on public channel RTP2, with some dialogue added to briefly describe each scene's contents.

It airs in the United States due to an exclusive multi-year distribution deal between Bert Smets Productions and NCircle Entertainment, a subsidiary of Alliance Entertainment, signed in 2007. The show was aired on BabyFirstTV.

References

External links
 
 

2000s preschool education television series
Belgian children's animated television series
Flemish television shows
Animated preschool education television series
Animated television series about rabbits and hares
Animated television series without speech
Computer-animated television series
2000 Belgian television series debuts
2008 Belgian television series endings
Ketnet original programming